Tei Tong Tsai is a village on Lantau Island, Hong Kong.

Administration
Tei Tong Tsai is a recognized village under the New Territories Small House Policy.

Features
Tei Tong Tsai, together with Ngong Ping, Luk Wu, Keung Shan and Man Cheung Po are considered as the five major Buddhist sites of Lantau Island, hosting numerous temples and gardens.

References

External links

 Delineation of area of existing village Tei Tong Tsai (Tung Chung) for election of resident representative (2019 to 2022)

Villages in Islands District, Hong Kong
Lantau Island